La Chapelle-Blanche-Saint-Martin, commonly known as La Chapelle-Blanche, is a commune in the Indre-et-Loire department, central France.

Population

See also
 Communes of the Indre-et-Loire department

References

Communes of Indre-et-Loire